André Waterkeyn (23 August 1917 – 4 October 2005) was a Belgian engineer, born in Wimbledon, London, best known for creating the Atomium.

Waterkeyn was the economic director of Fabrimetal (now Agoria), a federation of metallurgical companies when in 1954 he was asked to design a building for the 1958 Brussels World's Fair (Expo '58) that would symbolise Belgian engineering skills. 

Waterkeyn owned the copyrights of all reproductions of the Atomium until he passed it over to the organisation owning the original building around the year 2000. He was chairman of the board of the Atomium until 2002, when his son took over. He died in Brussels in 2005. After his death, the top sphere was named after him.

References

1917 births
2005 deaths
Belgian architects
Structural engineers
Belgian male field hockey players
Olympic field hockey players of Belgium
Field hockey players at the 1948 Summer Olympics